The Cambridge History of Latin America is a history of Latin America, edited by Leslie Bethell and published in 12 volumes between 1985–2008.

Contributors include David Brading, J.H. Elliott, John Hemming, Friedrich Katz, Herbert S. Klein, Miguel León-Portilla, James Lockhart, Murdo J. MacLeod, Jean Meyer, John Murra, David Rock, John Womack, among others.

Volumes
 Volume I: Colonial Latin America (1985)
 Volume II: Colonial Latin America (1985)
 Volume III: From Independence to c. 1870 (1985)
 Volume IV: c. 1870 to 1930 (1986)
 Volume V: c. 1870 to 1930 (1986)
 Volume VI: Latin America Since 1930: Part 1: Economy and Society (1995)
 Volume VI: Latin America Since 1930: Part 2: Politics and Society (1995)
 Volume VII: Latin America Since 1930: Mexico, Central America and the Caribbean (1990)
 Volume VIII: Latin America Since 1930: Spanish South America (1991)
 Volume IX: Brazil Since 1930 (2008)
 Volume X: Latin America Since 1930: Ideas, Culture and Society (1995)
 Volume XI: Bibliographical Essays (1995)

See also
 The Cambridge Economic History of Latin America

References
 Cambridge University website for the series: https://www.cambridge.org/us/academic/subjects/history/latin-american-history/series/cambridge-history-latin-america

Latin American history
Cambridge University Press books
Cambridge